Wherever the Five Winds Blow is an album by American jazz trumpeter, composer and arranger Shorty Rogers, released by RCA Victor  in 1957.

Reception

Allmusic awarded the album 3 stars.

Track listing 
All compositions by Shorty Rogers
 "Hurricane Carol" - 5:59
 "Breezin' Along in the Trades" - 9:14
 "Marooned in a Monsoon" - 4:52
 "The Chinook That Melted My Heart" - 10:18
 "Prevailing on the Westerlies" - 8:36

Personnel 
Shorty Rogers - trumpet
Jimmy Giuffre - clarinet, saxophone
Lou Levy - piano
Ralph Pena - bass 
Larry Bunker - drums

References 

Shorty Rogers albums
1957 albums
RCA Victor albums